Spinea is a town in the Metropolitan City of Venice, Veneto, Italy. It is within Mestre's commuter belt, and is crossed by the SP32 provincial road.

Twin towns
Spinea is twinned with:

  Veroli, Italy, since 2008

Sources
(Google Maps)